Tendayi (Samaita) Gahamadze (born July 3, 1959) is a Zimbabwean artist and songwriter.

Background
Tendayi Gahamadze was born at his parents' farm in Musengezi and went to Mkwasha Primary School. He went to Moleli for secondary education.

In 1979, he left for the United Kingdom where he did his A levels.

In 1982, he studied metallurgy in Germany.

Career background
Tendayi Gahamadze was a member of a school choir and learned to play instruments when he was in the UK. He was fascinated by the sound of Mbira but did not expect to play the instrument. Whilst in Germany at a seminar in Essen, he and his fellow Zimbabwean students had no option but to sing Ishe Komborera Africa in contrast with the Congolese and Latin American students who played their Rhumba and Salsa music respectively. On returning to Zimbabwe, he was told that it had been prophesied that he would be a prominent mbira player. Being 30, he brushed it aside and wondered how he would learn to play this instrument. A year later, he found himself under the mentorship of spiritual leader Choshata of the Mhara Mbuya Chikonamombe totem. He spent a year living with Albert and Benjamin Gobvu who were respected mbira players in Mhondoro. They assisted in the tuning of the mbiras but never attempted to play since it seemed far beyond his capabilities, according to Gahamadze. Choshata recommended that Tendayi buy his own Mbira, which he did. 

With this Mbira, he went to another Mbira manufacturer, Seke, who made two more mbiras of the same tuning for him. He left Choshata's shrine for Norton where his family was. He had in possession a set of three mbiras which he could not play. It happened overnight, as it were, that he started playing the mbira without being directed by anyone. He started teaming up with different mbira players and performing with them at cultural ceremonies and gatherings. Magwimbe Mlambo and Wilfred Mafrika were with him in the beginning. Having had some guitar band experience with college bands during his time at university, Tendayi went on to buy guitar pick-ups and started manufacturing his own mbiras and electrifying them. He formed the group Mbira dzeNharira which had its first recording, Rine Manyanga Hariputirwe, in 1998, which immediately topped the charts. 

To date Mbira dzeNharira has won five musical awards.

See also
Mbira dzeNharira
List of mbira players
List of Zimbabwean musicians
Mbira music
Shona music
Music of Africa

References

Zimbabwean songwriters
Living people
1959 births